Farewell to the mountains or, in Italian, is a famous passage of the VIII chapter of The Betrothed by Alessandro Manzoni.

The passage in the plot
Lucia and Renzo are escaping from their native village by barge because don Rodrigo wants to force the young woman to marry him; Lucia sees the place where she used to live and the suitor's castle, so she grieves and begins to cry. Manzoni reports Lucia's reflections and feelings.

Short analysis
This passage is the most lyrical of the entire novel: critics describe it as a poem in prose; in effect we can find some verses (decasyllables and hendecasyllables) hidden in the text. The register is high-level. The tone is idyllic, but don Rodrigo's presence in some measure darkens and fills with gloom the situation: because of him Lucia begins to cry and to reflect. This passage's purpose is to show character's and writer's feelings, so it is similar to the chorus in Manzoni's tragedies. In his novel the author always wants to control the narration, so he ends the idyllic pause very sharply and restarts narrating.

The theme of emigration is very important, but it is not the only one: the passage is also about religion and divine providence, that is The Betrothed's fil rouge (the author writes that God disturbs his sons' joy to donate them, at the end, a bigger joy).

See also
 The Betrothed
 Alessandro Manzoni

Bibliography
 Romano Luperini, Pietro Catadi, Lidia Marchiani, Franco Marchese, il nuovo La scrittura e l'interpretazione, volume 1, Palumbo editore, 
 a cura di Piero Gallardo, Il tesoro della prosa e della poesia italiane, volume V, Selezione dal Reader's Digest S.p.A., Verona, 1964

External links
 The Betrothed in English
 The novel in Italian

Italian literature
Alessandro Manzoni